Eublepharis is a genus of terrestrial geckos native to eastern and southwestern Asia. The genus was first described by the British zoologist John Edward Gray in 1827. The etymology of their name is 'eu' = good (=true) |'blephar' = eyelid, and all have fully functional eyelids. Members of this genus are found in eastern and southwestern Asia. These geckos are sturdily built. Their tail is shorter than their snout–vent length, and their body is covered with numerous wart-like bumps. The toes do not have adhesive lamellae or membranes (Eublepharis cannot climb like their other gecko cousins). Like all members of Eublepharidae, they are primarily nocturnal. Included in this group is the popular pet leopard gecko Eublepharis macularius.

Species of the genus Eublepharis

The members of the Goniurosaurus kuroiwae superspecies were formerly considered members of the genus Eublepharis.

References

External links 
Eublepharis in the Reptile Database

 
Lizard genera
Taxa named by John Edward Gray